Helt om natten, helt om dagen  is an album by Norwegian rapper Lars Vaular. It was released in 2010. The album entered the VG-lista on 3 May at #27, peaking the next week at #3, and staying in the Top 50 until the beginning of September. The album won the Spellemannprisen in 2010 in the hip hop category.

Track listing

Charting

References

External links

Lars Vaular albums
2010 albums
Norwegian-language albums